Mirza is a name derived from a historical noble title, which was granted to a person of distinction.

Other usage derived from this name:

Other uses
 Mirzayev or Mirzaev, is a variant spelling to the name in eastern Europe
 Mirza Sahiban, a popular romance story originating in the Punjab region
 "Mirza", a 1965 French-language song by Nino Ferrer
 Mirza, a town in the Kamrup district of Assam, India
 Mirza melon, a Californian variety of melon native to Central Asia

See also
 Mirzai (garment)
 Mirzapur (disambiguation)

References